Trunk to Cairo (German: Einer spielt falsch) is a 1965 Israeli-West German international co-production spy film directed by Menahem Golan and starring Audie Murphy and George Sanders. It was distributed by American International Pictures. It was Murphy's first non-western or war film since The Quiet American in 1958.

Plot
Mike Merrick (Audie Murphy) is an American agent who is sent to meet with Professor Schlieben (George Sanders) a German scientist. During the mission it is revealed that the professor is developing a weaponized rocket that can be used against the Western world. Merrick now must destroy the rocket plans hidden in Schlieben's lab. Things are further complicated when Radical Muslims insist on destroying the rocket themselves and killing Merrick. After kidnapping Schlieben's daughter he must now escape Middle Eastern intelligence agencies against impossible odds.

Cast
Audie Murphy  as Mike Merrick
George Sanders  as Professor Schlieben
Marianne Koch  as Helga Schlieben
Hans von Borsody  as Hans Klugg
Joseph Yadin  as Captain Gabar
Gila Almagor  as Yasmin
Eytan Priver  as Jamil
Bomba Zur  as Ali
Zeev Berlinsky as Benz
 Shlomo Vishinsky as Jacob 
 Tikva Mor as Christina
 Elana Eden as Hadassa
 Mona Silberstein  as Hostess 
 Yoel Noyman as Egyptian Colonel 
 Anna Schell  as Belly Dancer 
 Suzanna Ratoni Fräulein Bruckner 
 Menashe Glazier as Mahmud

Production
It was shot at the Spandau Studios in Berlin and on location in Rome and Israel from June to July 1965. The film's title was inspired by the 1964 discovery at Rome Airport of a bound and drugged man inside a trunk sent from the Egyptian Embassy at Rome to Cairo, marked "diplomatic mail." The film included music by Dov Seltzer and a song "Dangerous Woman" written by Jean Raskin and sung by Ouela Gill.

See also 
 Operation Damocles (German rocket scientists in Egypt)

References

External links
 

Films set in Egypt
1965 films
West German films
American International Pictures films
1960s thriller drama films
1960s spy thriller films
Israeli thriller drama films
German thriller drama films
German spy thriller films
Audie Murphy
Films about the Arab–Israeli conflict
1965 drama films
Constantin Film films
Films shot at Spandau Studios
Films shot in Israel
Films shot in Rome
English-language German films
English-language Israeli films
Films produced by Menahem Golan
Films directed by Menahem Golan
1960s English-language films
1960s German films